David Michael Littlefield (born June 16, 1960) is a former Major League Baseball executive, who is currently a scout for the Detroit Tigers. Previously, Littlefield was employed as Senior Vice President and General Manager of the Pittsburgh Pirates, a position he held from July 13, 2001, to September 7, 2007.  He took over as GM for Roy Smith, who had assumed the position on a temporary basis after the firing of GM Cam Bonifay on June 11.

Early years
In 1984, Littlefield was an assistant coach for the Orleans Cardinals of the Cape Cod Baseball League.

Pittsburgh Pirates

2003 Rule 5 draft
Littlefield received a large amount of negative publicity after the Pirates lost five prospects from their minor league system with the first six picks in the 2003 Rule 5 draft, even though they had unused spots on their 40-man roster and could have protected several of the players if they had chosen to do so. Chris Shelton, who had recently been honored as the team's minor league player of the year, went with the first pick, and he was followed in short order by Rich Thompson, Frank Brooks, Jeff Bennett, and José Bautista. The Cincinnati Reds, picking seventh, had all five Pirate players listed on their draft board and were frustrated to see them all go too soon, and an anonymous executive from another American League team said that his team had also planned to take a Pirate prospect, refraining only because in his words, "There wasn't anything left."

Trading record
Littlefield acquired a reputation throughout MLB as a difficult trading partner, in that his demands during negotiations were often seen as grossly excessive. It was rumored that Littlefield turned down a trade offer in 2005 with former GM of the Philadelphia Phillies, Ed Wade, in which the Pirates would swap pitcher Kip Wells for the Phillies' Ryan Howard. There were also unconfirmed reports that Littlefield turned down trading Howard for pitcher Kris Benson a year earlier.

Littlefield was criticized for trading players such as Jason Schmidt, Jason Kendall, Sean Casey, Aramis Ramírez, Chris Young, Gary Matthews, Jr., and Kenny Lofton for little or nothing in return. While small market teams thrive on trading established veterans for packages of talented minor leaguers, Littlefield repeatedly asked for lower-ceiling "Major League ready" prospects in return. As a result, when he left, the Pirates had a plethora of mid-to-late 20s, borderline Major Leaguers, and very few young, impact prospects within the system.  This strategy runs contrary to that of successful low-payroll teams like the A's, Twins, and Marlins.

In 2003, Littlefield approached the San Diego Padres with a trade proposal in which the Pirates would receive Xavier Nady, Óliver Pérez, and minor league pitcher Cory Stewart in exchange for star outfielder Brian Giles. The Padres refused to surrender Nady, so Littlefield and the Pirates agreed to accept Jason Bay instead.  Bay immediately emerged as a star, winning the National League Rookie of the Year award in 2004, while Nady spent the next three seasons as a part-time player with the Padres and the New York Mets. Two years later, Littlefield was successful in trading for Nady in a deal for inconsistent pitcher Óliver Pérez as well as veteran reliever, and soon to be free agent, Roberto Hernández and the compensatory draft pick the Mets received when Hernández left as a free agent that offseason.

Among his most widely lampooned transactions to date was the trade of pitcher Chris Young, in whom the Pirates had invested $1.5 million, to Montreal for Matt Herges in December 2002.  Herges was promptly released in spring training, while Young was hailed as one of the best young pitchers in baseball four years later after having been traded from the Montreal Expos to the Texas Rangers and, finally, to the San Diego Padres, where he had an outstanding season in 2007 then struggled afterward.  Similarly, the 21-year-old Leo Núñez was traded to Kansas City in December 2004; in return, the Pirates received 39-year-old Benito Santiago in order to fill an immediate hole at the catcher position. Núñez has had some successful stretches for the Royals; Santiago had 6 hits with the Pirates before being released one month into the 2005 season.  Some argue trading away future impact players has severely hindered the Pirates in recent years.

On July 31, 2007, Littlefield traded outfielder Rajai Davis to the San Francisco Giants for pitcher Matt Morris.  The move was widely criticized, as Morris, who was 7–7 with a 4.35 ERA at the time of the trade, was slated to make $9.5 million in 2008.  Many were surprised that the Pirates would take on such a large contract (especially without having the Giants pick up part of it), as their 2007 Opening Day payroll was just $38.5 million.
  At the time of the trade, the Pirates were 42–62, 14.5 games out of first place.

Though he was frequently criticized for some trades that worked out poorly in the long run, Littlefield also managed to acquire the bulk of the Pirates' lineup through trades during his tenure.  Jason Bay, Freddy Sanchez, Adam LaRoche, José Bautista, and Xavier Nady were all acquired through trades.  In his final season as GM, only one of the seven players with over 400 at-bats on the team, Ronny Paulino, was not acquired through a trade.  At the same time, this group finished in last place in their division, so even his more successful trades weren't enough to field a contender.

Drafting players
During Littlefield's tenure, the Pirates were widely criticized for taking players that were perceived to be more signable than talented. The most notable examples of this were in 2002 and 2007. In 2002, the Pirates passed over Melvin Upton, Jr., widely regarded as the top prospect at the time, with the first overall pick—also passing over other highly touted prospects, including Prince Fielder, Zack Greinke, Khalil Greene, Scott Kazmir, Nick Swisher, Matt Cain, Cole Hamels and Jeff Francoeur—and drafted Bryan Bullington, who Littlefield said could be a "good #3 pitcher". After battling with injuries, Bullington was waived by the Pirates in 2008. In 2007, Littlefield and the Pirates passed over the top-ranked college hitting prospect, Matt Wieters, and instead drafted pitcher Daniel Moskos. Moskos had an inconsistent career in the minors (only playing in the MLB for the 2011 season), while Wieters was a four-time All-Star and two-time Gold Glove Award winner who would play in the MLB for 12 seasons. Littlefield's  other #1 draft picks were Paul Maholm (2003), Neil Walker (2004), Andrew McCutchen (2005), and Brad Lincoln (2006).  Lincoln was drafted two picks before now superstar pitcher Clayton Kershaw was drafted by Los Angeles

Latin America
Under Littlefield's direction, the Pirates were less aggressive than other teams in signing players from Latin America.  At the end of his tenure, the team had no Latin American impact prospects within their minor league system, and those on the major league roster were regarded by many as marginal talents, most signed or acquired before Littlefield's tenure: José Bautista, Ronny Paulino, Jose Castillo, Salomón Torres, Dámaso Marte, and Tony Armas.  The Pirates were widely criticized for failing to employ a Latin American scouting director until hiring Rene Gayo nearly three years after Littlefield took over as General Manager.  In addition, the team's facilities were widely considered to be among the worst in baseball.  While other teams have recognized the benefits of signing such talent at relatively reasonable prices, the Pirates did not extend a signing bonus of more than $85,000 to a Latin American prospect during Littlefield's tenure.  Some contend (particularly beat writer Dejan Kovacevic) that, as much as any other decision during Littlefield's tenure, the lack of emphasis on competing in Latin America was one of the most confounding and debilitating for the organization.

Firing
Littlefield was fired on the morning of September 7, 2007. The announcement came shortly before the Pirates could clinch their seventh consecutive losing season under his management.  The Pirates never finished higher than 4th place in the NL Central.  Brian Graham, the director of player development for the Pirates, served as interim general manager until new Pirates GM Neal Huntington took over September 25, 2007.

The Aftermath
In the first 2 years following the Dave Littlefield era, almost every player acquired by Littlefield was purged from the Pirates major league roster, most of them via trade.  These trades were made primarily to restock a farm system that was left completely bereft of impact talent and needed to be restocked in order to make the Pirates a long term contender.  While many of these trades were roundly criticized by fans and media alike, Neal Huntington, Pirates GM at the time the trades were made, justified them by saying that he wasn't breaking up the 1927 Yankees.

Chicago Cubs
On December 19, 2007, Littlefield was named a scout for the Chicago Cubs.

Detroit Tigers
On October 20, 2014, Littlefield was named a scout for the Detroit Tigers. On August 11, 2015, Littlefield was promoted to vice president of player development. He was demoted back to scout in August 2021.

References

External links
Littlefield's official biography with the Pirates.

1960 births
Living people
Chicago Cubs scouts
Detroit Tigers scouts
Major League Baseball executives
Major League Baseball general managers
Pittsburgh Pirates executives
Cape Cod Baseball League coaches
Isenberg School of Management alumni
University of Massachusetts Amherst alumni
Portland High School (Maine) alumni